Carlo Occhiena (born 24 September 1972, in Turin) is a former Italian sprinter.

He won five national championships.

International competitions

National titles
Italian Athletics Championships
200 metres: 1998
Italian Athletics Indoor Championships
200 metres: 1990. 1993, 1998, 1999

See also
 Italian all-time top lists - 200 metres
 Italy national relay team

References

External links
 

1972 births
Living people
Sportspeople from Turin
Italian male sprinters
Athletics competitors of Fiamme Oro
Universiade medalists in athletics (track and field)
World Athletics Championships athletes for Italy
Universiade bronze medalists for Italy
Medalists at the 1995 Summer Universiade
Italian Athletics Championships winners